Perez Morton (November 13, 1751 – October 14, 1837) was a lawyer and revolutionary patriot in Boston, Massachusetts.

Life and career
Morton was born in Plymouth, Massachusetts in 1751, and raised in Boston. His father, Joseph Morton, worked as a tavern-keeper at the White Horse Tavern.  Perez attended the Boston Latin School starting around 1760, and Harvard College, graduating in 1771.  He was admitted to the Massachusetts bar in 1774.

He participated in the Committee of Safety, and the Committee of Correspondence; he was also a Mason, serving as Deputy Grand Master of the Grand Lodge of Massachusetts in 1789-1790.  In 1775-1776, he was Deputy Secretary of the Council of the Colony of Massachusetts Bay.  On April 8, 1776, Morton spoke at the memorial service held for Joseph Warren, at King's Chapel.

In 1778, he married Sarah Wentworth Apthorp. Together they had 5 children: Sarah Apthorp Morton (1782–1844);  Anna Louisa Morton (1783–1843);  Frances Wentworth Morton (1785–1831);  Charles Ward Apthorp Morton (1786–1809);  and Charlotte Morton (1787–1819)  From ca.1796 to ca.1803, the Mortons owned a house on Dudley Street in Dorchester; the house may have been designed by Charles Bulfinch. Friends and associates of Morton included James Bowdoin, John Adams, and James Swan.

In 1788, the Mortons were the subject of a public scandal regarding an illegitimate child of Sarah Morton's sister, Fanny Apthorp, rumored to have had an affair with Perez. The scandal was amplified in the press, notably the Massachusetts Centinel and the Herald of Freedom and the Federal Advertiser. A novel published in 1789, The Power of Sympathy, written by a neighbor of the Mortons, William Hill Brown, depicted an adulterous affair between a man and his sister-in-law; at the time, many suspected the novel to be based on the real-life Morton/Apthorp affair.

Morton served as Massachusetts Speaker of the House, 1806–1808, and 1810–1811; and as Massachusetts Attorney General, 1810-1832.

He died in Dorchester in 1837.

Portraits of Morton have been made by Charles Balthazar Julien Févret de Saint-Mémin, and others.  Some items owned by Perez Morton are now in the collection of the Museum of Fine Arts, Boston, including a silver ladle made by Paul Revere.

Morton's daughter Charlotte was the wife of Andrew Dexter, Jr.

Morton wrote the text of the hymn When Jesus Wept, music composed by William Billings.

References

Further reading
 Francis B. Heitman. Historical Register of Officers of the Continental Army during the War of the Revolution April 1775, to December 1783. Washington, D.C.: The Rare Book Shop Publishing Company, Inc., 1914.
 Emily Pendleton, Milton Ellis. Philenia: The Life and Works of Sarah Wentworth Morton, 1759-1846. 1931.
 Clifford K. Shipton. Sibley's Harvard graduates; Volume 17, the Classes 1768-1771. 1975.
 Richard Walser. "Boston's Reception of the First American Novel". Early American Literature, Vol. 17, No. 1 (Spring, 1982), pp. 65–74.
 Jane Kamensky. The exchange artist: a tale of high-flying speculation and America's first banking collapse. Viking, 2008; p. 43+

External links

1751 births
1837 deaths
People of Massachusetts in the American Revolution
Boston Latin School alumni
Harvard College alumni
Massachusetts Attorneys General
Speakers of the Massachusetts House of Representatives
Members of the Massachusetts House of Representatives
Massachusetts lawyers
People from Plymouth, Massachusetts
Politicians from Boston
18th-century American people
18th century in Boston
19th century in Boston
Lawyers from Boston
19th-century American lawyers